Vins de primeur (or nouveaux wines) are French wines permitted by Appellation d'origine contrôlée (AOC) regulations to be sold in the same year that they are harvested. The most widely exported nouveau wine is Beaujolais nouveau, which is released on the third Thursday of November, often only a few weeks after the grapes were harvested. As of 2005, there were 55 AOCs in France permitted to make nouveau wines. Less than half of these AOCs are required to have the words primeur or nouveau printed on the label. Depending the AOC regulations, a nouveau wine may be red, white or rosé.

White only

Anjou AOC
Blayais AOC
Bourgogne AOC
Bourgogne aligoté AOC
Bourgogne Grand Ordinaire AOC
Côtes de Bourg AOC
Entre-Deux-Mers AOC
Graves AOC
Graves de Vayres AOC
Mâcon supérieur AOC
Mâcon-villages AOC
Muscadet AOC
Muscadet de Sèvre-et-Maine AOC
Muscadet des coteaux de la Loire AOC
Muscadet Côtes de Grand-Lieu AOC
Premières Côtes de Blaye AOC
Sainte-Foy-Bordeaux AOC
Saumur AOC
Touraine AOC

Rosé only
Bordeaux AOC
Cabernet d'Anjou AOC
Cabernet de Saumur AOC
Faugères AOC
Rosé d'Anjou AOC
Rosé de Loire AOC
Saint-Chinian AOC
Tavel AOC
Touraine AOC

White or rosé
Buzet AOC
Corbières AOC
Costières de Nîmes AOC
Coteaux d'Aix-en-Provence AOC
Coteaux du Languedoc AOC
Coteaux Varois AOC
Côtes de Duras AOC
Côtes du Marmandais AOC
Côtes de Provence AOC
Mâcon AOC
Minervois AOC
Montravel AOC

Red or rosé
Anjou Gamay AOC
Beaujolais AOC (Beaujolais Nouveau)
Beaujolais supérieur AOC
Beaujolais-Villages AOC
Coteaux du Languedoc AOC
Touraine Gamay AOC

All styles
Bergerac AOC
Coteaux du Lyonnais AOC
Coteaux du Tricastin AOC
Côtes du Rhône AOC
Côtes du Roussillon AOC
Côtes du Ventoux AOC
Gaillac AOC
Jurançon AOC

References

French wine AOCs